Omophron aequale is a species of ground beetle in the family Carabidae. It is distributed in East Asia.

The species is very similar to Omophron limbatum. Although the puncturation (the arrangement of punctures) on the pronotum of O. aequale is a little finer than that of O. limbatum, it is denser. The species also has denser and coarser puncturation on the side margins of the first two sternites.

Omophron aequale is divided into 2 subspecies: O. aequale aequale and O. aequale jacobsoni.

O. aequale aequale has a length between 6.4 and 7.2 mm and a width between 4.2 and 4.4 mm. It is distributed in Japan and Sakhalin Island, Russia.

O. aequale jacobsoni has a length between 6.5 and 6.9 mm and a width between 4.1 and 4.5 mm. It is distributed in China (Guandong, Guanxi, Hainan, Jiangsu, Nei Mongol, Sichuan, Shanki, Yunnan, and Zhejiang), Mongolia, North Korea, South Korea, and eastern Russia.

References

Further reading 
 Chaudoir, M. (1868). Note monographique sur le genre Omophron. Revue et magasin de zoologie pure et appliquée, 20: 54–63. https://www.biodiversitylibrary.org/item/19604#page/7/mode/1up
 Gestro, R. (1892). Appunti sul genere Omophron. Annali del Museo Civico di Storia Naturale di Genova, 10(1890–1891): 61.
 Hurka, K. (2003). Omophroninae. In: I. Löbl & Smetana A. (Eds.) Catalogue of Palearctic Coleoptera, Vol. 1. Stenstrup: Apollo Books, 207–208.
 Kryzhanovskij, O. L. (1982). A review of Palaearctic species of the genus Omophron Latr. (Coleoptera, Carabidae). Entomologicheskoe obozrenie, 61(1): 107–116.
 Kryzhanovskij, O. L., Belousov, I. A., Kabak, I. I., Kataev, B. M., Makarov, K. V., & Shilenkov, V. G. (1995). Genus Omophron Latreille. A Checklist of the Ground-Beetles of Russia and Adjacent Lands (Insecta, Coleoptera, Carabidae). Pensoft Publishers. SofiaMoscow, 1995: 28.
 Morawitz, A. (1863). Beitrag zur Käferfauna der Insel Jesso. Erste Lieferung. Cicindelidae et Carabici. Mémories de l’ Académie Impériale des Sciences de St-Pétersbourg (7) 6 (3): 6.
 Semenov-Tian-Shanskij, A. (1922). Du duabus novis generis Omophron Latr. formis paleareticis (Coleoptera: Carabidae). Revue Russe d’Entom., XVIII: 46–48.
 Tian, M., & Deuve, T. (2000). Taxonomic notes on the genus Omophron Latreille, 1802, in China, with descriptions of four new species (Coleoptera, Carabidae, Omophronini). Revue Francaise d’entomologie (nouvelle serie) 22(2–3), 2000: 65–72.

Carabidae
Beetles described in 1863